Nathan Bedford Forrest (July 13, 1821October 29, 1877) was a prominent Confederate Army general during the American Civil War and the first Grand Wizard of the Ku Klux Klan from 1867 to 1869. Before the war, Forrest amassed substantial wealth as a cotton plantation owner, horse, and cattle trader, real estate broker, and slave trader. In June 1861, he enlisted in the Confederate Army and became one of the few soldiers during the war to enlist as a private and be promoted to general without any prior military training. An expert cavalry leader, Forrest was given command of a corps and established new doctrines for mobile forces, earning the nickname "The Wizard of the Saddle". He used his cavalry troops as mounted infantry and often deployed artillery as the lead in battle, thus helping to "revolutionize cavalry tactics", although the Confederate high command is seen by some commentators to have underappreciated his talents. While scholars generally acknowledge Forrest's skills and acumen as a cavalry leader and military strategist, he is a controversial figure in U.S. history for his role in the massacre of several hundred U.S. Army soldiers at Fort Pillow, a majority of them black, coupled with his role following the war as a leader of the Klan.

In April 1864, in what has been called "one of the bleakest, saddest events of American military history", troops under Forrest's command at the Battle of Fort Pillow massacred hundreds of troops, composed of black soldiers and white Tennessean Southern Unionists fighting for the United States, who had already surrendered. Forrest was blamed for the slaughter in the U.S. press, and this news may have strengthened the United States's resolve to win the war. Forrest's responsibility for the massacre continues to be actively debated by historians.

Forrest, who was a Freemason, joined the Ku Klux Klan in 1867 (two years after its founding) and was elected its first Grand Wizard. The group was a loose collection of local factions throughout the former Confederacy that used violence and the threat of violence to maintain white control over the newly enfranchised formerly enslaved people. The Klan, with Forrest at the lead, suppressed the voting rights of blacks in the Southern United States through violence and intimidation during the elections of 1868. In 1869, Forrest expressed disillusionment with the lack of discipline in the white supremacist terrorist group across the South, and issued a letter ordering the dissolution of the Ku Klux Klan as well as the destruction of its costumes; he then withdrew from the organization. In the last years of his life, Forrest insisted he had never been a member, and made public calls for black advancement.

In June 2021, the remains of Forrest and his wife were exhumed from Health Sciences Park, where they had been buried for over 100 years, and a monument of him once stood. They were later reburied in Columbia, Tennessee. In July 2021, Tennessee officials voted to move Forrest's bust from the State Capitol to the Tennessee State Museum.

Early life and career

Nathan Bedford Forrest was born on July 13, 1821, to a poor settler family in a secluded frontier cabin near Chapel Hill hamlet, then part of Bedford County, Tennessee, but now encompassed in Marshall County. Forrest was the first son of Mariam (Beck) and William Forrest. His blacksmith father was of English descent, and most of his biographers state that his mother was of Scotch-Irish descent, but the Memphis Genealogical Society says that she was of English descent. He and his twin sister, Fanny, were the two eldest of 12 children. Their great-grandfather, Shadrach Forrest, moved between 1730 and 1740 from Virginia to North Carolina, where his son and grandson were born; they moved to Tennessee in 1806. Forrest's family lived in a log house (now preserved as the Nathan Bedford Forrest Boyhood Home) from 1830 to 1833. John Allan Wyeth, who served in an Alabama regiment under Forrest, described it as a one-room building with a loft and no windows. William Forrest worked as a blacksmith in Tennessee until 1834, when he moved with his family to Salem, Mississippi. William died in 1837 and Forrest became the primary caretaker of the family at age 16.

In 1841 Forrest went into business with his uncle Jonathan Forrest in Hernando, Mississippi. His uncle was killed there in 1845 during an argument with the Matlock brothers. In retaliation, Forrest shot and killed two of them with his two-shot pistol and wounded two others with a knife thrown to him. One of the wounded Matlock men survived and served under Forrest during the Civil War.

Forrest had success as a businessman, planter, and enslaver. He acquired several cotton plantations in the Delta region of West Tennessee, and became a slave trader at a time when demand for enslaved people was booming in the Deep South; his slave-trading business was based on Adams Street in Memphis. In 1858, Forrest was elected a Memphis city alderman as a Democrat and served two consecutive terms. By the time the American Civil War started in 1861, he had become one of the wealthiest men in the Southern United States, having amassed a "personal fortune that he claimed was worth $1.5 million".

Forrest was well-known as a Memphis speculator and Mississippi gambler. In 1859, he bought two large cotton plantations in Coahoma County, Mississippi and a half-interest in another plantation in Arkansas; by October 1860, he owned at least 3,345 acres in Mississippi.

Forrest rarely drank and abstained from tobacco use; he was often described as generally mild-mannered, but according to Hosea and other contemporaries who knew him, his demeanor changed drastically when provoked or angered. He was known as a tireless rider in the saddle and a skilled swordsman. Although he was not formally educated, Forrest was able to read and write in clear and grammatical English.

Marriage and family
Forrest had twelve brothers and sisters; two of his eight brothers and three of his four sisters died of typhoid fever at an early age, all at about the same time. He also contracted the disease, but survived; his father recovered but died from residual effects of the disease five years later when Bedford was 16. His mother, Miriam, then married James Horatio Luxton, of Marshall, Texas, in 1843 and gave birth to four more children.

In 1845, Forrest married Mary Ann Montgomery (1826–1893), the niece of a Presbyterian minister who was her legal guardian. They had two children, William Montgomery Bedford Forrest (1846–1908), who enlisted at the age of 15 and served alongside his father in the war, and a daughter, Fanny (1849–1854), who died in childhood.

Forrest's grandson, Nathan Bedford Forrest II (1872–1931), became commander-in-chief of the Sons of Confederate Veterans and a Grand Dragon of the Ku Klux Klan in Georgia and secretary of the national organization. A great-grandson, Nathan Bedford Forrest III (1905–1943), graduated from West Point and rose to the rank of brigadier general in the U.S. Army Air Corps; he was killed during a bombing raid over Nazi Germany in 1943, becoming the first American general to die in combat in the European theater during World War II.

American Civil War

Early cavalry command
After the Civil War broke out, Forrest returned to Tennessee from his Mississippi ventures and enlisted in the Confederate States Army (CSA) on June 14, 1861. He reported for training at Fort Wright near Randolph, Tennessee, joining Captain Josiah White's cavalry company, the Tennessee Mounted Rifles (Seventh Tennessee Cavalry), as a private along with his youngest brother and 15-year-old son. Upon seeing how badly equipped the CSA was, Forrest offered to buy horses and equipment with his own money for a regiment of Tennessee volunteer soldiers.

His superior officers and Governor of Tennessee Isham G. Harris were surprised that someone of Forrest's wealth and prominence had enlisted as a soldier, especially since significant planters were exempted from service. They commissioned him as a lieutenant colonel and authorized him to recruit and train a battalion of Confederate mounted rangers. In October 1861, Forrest was given command of a regiment, the 3rd Tennessee Cavalry. Though Forrest had no prior formal military training or experience, he had exhibited leadership and soon proved he could successfully employ tactics.

Public debate surrounded Tennessee's decision to join the Confederacy, and both the Confederate and United States armies recruited soldiers from the state. Over 100,000 men from Tennessee served with the Confederacy, and over 31,000 served with the U.S. Army. Forrest posted advertisements to join his regiment, with the slogan, "Let's have some fun and kill some Yankees!". Forrest's command included his Escort Company (his "Special Forces"), for which he selected the best soldiers available. This unit, which varied in size from 40 to 90 men, constituted the elite of his cavalry.

Sacramento and Fort Donelson

Forrest won praise for his performance under fire during an early victory in the Battle of Sacramento in Kentucky, the first in which he commanded troops in the field, where he routed a U.S. Army force by personally leading a cavalry charge that Brigadier General Charles Clark later commended. Forrest distinguished himself further at the Battle of Fort Donelson in February 1862. After his cavalry captured a U.S. artillery battery, he broke out of a siege headed by Major General Ulysses S. Grant, rallying nearly 4,000 troops and leading them to escape across the Cumberland River.

A few days after the Confederate surrender of Fort Donelson, with the fall of Nashville to U.S. forces imminent, Forrest took command of the city. All available carts and wagons were pressed into service to haul six hundred boxes of army clothing, 250,000 pounds of bacon, and forty wagon-loads of ammunition to the railroad depots, to be sent off to Chattanooga and Decatur. Forrest arranged for heavy ordnance machinery, including a new cannon rifling machine and fourteen cannons, as well as parts from the Nashville Armory, to be sent to Atlanta for use by the Confederate Army.

Shiloh and Murfreesboro
A month later, Forrest was back in action at the Battle of Shiloh, fought April 6–7, 1862. After the U.S. victory, Forrest commanded a Confederate rear guard. In the battle of Fallen Timbers, he drove through the U.S. skirmish line. Not realizing that the rest of his men had halted their charge when they reached the full U.S.  brigade, Forrest charged the brigade alone and soon found himself surrounded. He emptied his Colt Army revolvers into the swirling mass of U.S. Army soldiers and pulled out his saber, hacking, and slashing. A U.S. infantryman on the ground beside Forrest fired a musket ball at him with a point-blank shot, nearly knocking him out of the saddle. The ball went through Forrest's pelvis and lodged near his spine. A surgeon removed the musket ball a week later without anesthesia, which was unavailable.

By early summer, Forrest commanded a new brigade of inexperienced cavalry regiments. He led them into Middle Tennessee in July under orders to launch a cavalry raid. On July 13, 1862, led them into the First Battle of Murfreesboro, as a result of which all of the U.S. units surrendered to Forrest. The Confederates destroyed much of the U.S. Army's supplies and railroad tracks in the area.

West Tennessee raids

Promoted on July 21, 1862, to brigadier general, Forrest was given command of a Confederate cavalry brigade. In December 1862, Forrest's veteran troopers were reassigned by General Braxton Bragg to another officer against his protest. Forrest had to recruit a new brigade of about 2,000 inexperienced recruits, most of whom lacked weapons. Again, Bragg ordered a series of raids to disrupt the communications of the U.S. Army forces under Grant, which were threatening the city of Vicksburg, Mississippi. Forrest protested that sending such untrained men behind enemy lines was suicidal, but Bragg insisted, and Forrest obeyed his orders. In the ensuing raids, he was pursued by thousands of U.S. soldiers trying to locate his fast-moving forces. Avoiding attack by never staying in one place long, Forrest eventually led his troops during the spring and summer of 1864 on raids into west Tennessee, as far north as the banks of the Ohio River in southwest Kentucky and into north Mississippi.

Forrest returned to his base in Mississippi with more men than he had started with. By then, all were fully armed with captured U.S. Army weapons. As a result, Grant was forced to revise and delay his Vicksburg campaign strategy. Newspaper correspondent Sylvanus Cadwallader, who traveled with Grant for three years during his campaigns, wrote that Forrest "was the only Confederate cavalryman of whom Grant stood in much dread".

Dover, Brentwood, and Chattanooga
The U.S. Army gained military control of Tennessee in 1862 and occupied it for the duration of the war, having taken control of strategic cities and railroads. Forrest continued to lead his men in small-scale operations, including the Battle of Dover and the Battle of Brentwood until April 1863. The Confederate army dispatched him with a small force into the backcountry of northern Alabama and western Georgia to defend against an attack of 3,000 U.S. Army cavalrymen commanded by Colonel Abel Streight. Streight had orders to cut the Confederate railroad south of Chattanooga, Tennessee to seal off Bragg's supply line and force him to retreat into Georgia. Forrest chased Streight's men for 16 days, harassing them all the way. Streight's goal changed from dismantling the railroad to escaping the pursuit. On May 3, Forrest caught up with Streight's unit east of Cedar Bluff, Alabama. Forrest had fewer men than the U.S. side but feigned having a larger force by repeatedly parading some around a hilltop until Streight was convinced to surrender his 1,500 or so exhausted troops (historians Kevin Dougherty and Keith S. Hebert say he had about 1,700 men).

Day's Gap, Chickamauga, and Paducah
Not all of Forrest's exploits of individual combat involved enemy troops. Lieutenant Andrew Wills Gould, an artillery officer in Forrest's command, was being transferred, presumably because cannons under his command were spiked (disabled) by the enemy during the Battle of Day's Gap. On June 13, 1863, Gould confronted Forrest about his transfer, which escalated into a violent exchange. Gould shot Forrest in the hip, and Forrest mortally stabbed Gould. Forrest was thought to have been fatally wounded by Gould, but he recovered and was ready to fight in the Chickamauga Campaign.

Forrest served with the main army at the Battle of Chickamauga on September 18–20, 1863, in which he pursued the retreating U.S. Army and took hundreds of prisoners. Like several others under Bragg's command, he urged an immediate follow-up attack to recapture Chattanooga, which had fallen a few weeks before. Bragg failed to do so, upon which Forrest was quoted as saying, "What does he fight battles for?" The story that Forrest confronted and threatened the life of Bragg in the fall of 1863, following the battle of Chickamauga, and that Bragg transferred Forrest to command in Mississippi as a direct result, is now considered to be apocryphal.

On December 4, 1863, Forrest was promoted to the rank of major general. On March 25, 1864, Forrest's cavalry raided the town of Paducah, Kentucky in the Battle of Paducah, during which Forrest demanded the surrender of U.S. Colonel Stephen G. Hicks: "if I have to storm your works, you may expect no quarter." Hicks refused to comply with the ultimatum, and according to his subsequent report, Forrest's troops took a position and set up a battery of guns while a flag of truce was still up. As soon as they received the U.S. reply, they moved forward at the command of a junior officer, and the U.S. forces opened fire. The Confederates tried to storm the fort but were repulsed; they rallied and made two more attempts, both of which failed.

Fort Pillow massacre

Fort Pillow, located  upriver from Memphis (near Henning, Tennessee), was initially constructed by Confederate general Gideon Johnson Pillow on the bluffs of the Mississippi River, and taken over by U.S. forces in 1862 after the Confederates had abandoned the fort. The fort was defended by 557 U.S. Army troops, 295 white and 262 black, under U.S. Army Maj. L.F. Booth.

On April 12, 1864, Forrest's men, under Brig. Gen. James Chalmers, attacked and recaptured Fort Pillow. Booth and his adjutant were killed in the battle, leaving Fort Pillow under the command of Major William Bradford. Forrest had reached the fort at 10:00 am after a hard ride from Mississippi, and his horse was soon shot out from under him, causing him to fall to the ground. He then mounted a second horse, shot out from under him, forcing him to mount a third horse. By 3:30 pm, Forrest had concluded that the U.S. troops could not hold the fort; thus, he ordered a flag of truce raised and demanded that the fort be surrendered. Bradford refused to surrender, believing his troops could escape to the U.S. Navy gunboat, USS New Era, on the Mississippi River. Forrest's men immediately took over the fort, while U.S. Army soldiers retreated to the lower bluffs of the river, but the USS New Era did not come to their rescue. What happened next became known as the Fort Pillow Massacre. As the U.S. Army troops surrendered, Forrest's men opened fire, slaughtering black and white U.S. Army soldiers. According to historians John Cimprich and Bruce Tap, although their numbers were roughly equal, two-thirds of the black U.S. Army soldiers were killed, while only a third of the whites were killed. The atrocities at Fort Pillow continued throughout the night. Conflicting accounts of what occurred were given later.

Forrest's Confederate forces were accused of subjecting captured U.S. Army soldiers to extreme brutality, with allegations of back-shooting soldiers who fled into the river, shooting wounded soldiers, burning men alive, nailing men to barrels and igniting them, crucifixion, and hacking men to death with sabers. Forrest's men were alleged to have set fire to a U.S. barracks with wounded U.S. Army soldiers inside In defense of their actions, Forrest's men insisted that the U.S. soldiers, although fleeing, kept their weapons and frequently turned to shoot, forcing the Confederates to keep firing in self-defense. The rebels said the U.S. flag was still flying over the fort, which indicated that the force had not formally surrendered. A contemporary newspaper account from Jackson, Tennessee stated that "General Forrest begged them to surrender", but "not the first sign of surrender was ever given". Similar accounts were reported in many Confederate newspapers at the time. These statements were contradicted by U.S. Army survivors and by the letter of a Confederate soldier who graphically recounted a massacre. Achilles Clark, a soldier with the 20th Tennessee cavalry, wrote to his sisters immediately after the battle:

Following the cessation of hostilities, Forrest transferred the 14 most seriously wounded United States Colored Troops (USCT) to the U.S. steamer Silver Cloud. The 226 U.S. Army troops taken prisoner at Fort Pillow were marched under guard to Holly Springs, Mississippi and then convoyed to Demopolis, Alabama. On April 21, Capt. John Goodwin, of Forrest's cavalry command, forwarded a dispatch listing the prisoners captured. The list included the names of 7 officers and 219 white enlisted soldiers. According to Richard L. Fuchs, "records concerning the fate of the black prisoners are either nonexistent or unreliable". President Abraham Lincoln asked his cabinet for opinions as to how the United States should respond to the massacre.

At the time of the massacre, General Grant was no longer in Tennessee but had transferred to the east to command all U.S. troops. Grant wrote in his memoirs that Forrest, in his report of the battle, had "left out the part which shocks humanity to read".

Because of the events at Fort Pillow, the U.S. public and press viewed Forrest as a war criminal. The Chicago Tribune said Forrest and his brothers were "slave drivers and woman whippers", while Forrest himself was described as "mean, vindictive, cruel, and unscrupulous". The Confederate press steadfastly defended Forrest's reputation.

S.C. Gwynne writes, "Forrest's responsibility for the massacre has been actively debated for a century and a half. ... No direct evidence suggests that he ordered the shooting of surrendering or unarmed men, but to fully exonerate him from responsibility is also impossible".

Brices Cross Roads and Tupelo

Forrest's most decisive victory came on June 10, 1864, when his 3,500-man force clashed with 8,500 men commanded by U.S. Army Brig. Gen. Samuel D. Sturgis at the Battle of Brices Crossroads in northeastern Mississippi. Here, the mobility of the troops under his command and his superior tactics led to victory, allowing him to continue harassing U.S. forces in southwestern Tennessee and northern Mississippi throughout the war. Forrest set up a position for an attack to repulse a pursuing force commanded by Sturgis, who had been sent to impede Forrest from destroying U.S. Army supply lines and fortifications. When Sturgis's Federal army came upon the crossroads, they collided with Forrest's cavalry. Sturgis ordered his infantry to advance to the front line to counteract the cavalry. The infantry, tired, weary, and suffering under the heat, were quickly broken and sent into mass retreat. Forrest sent a full charge after the retreating army and captured 16 artillery pieces, 176 wagons, and 1,500 stands of small arms. In all, the maneuver cost Forrest 96 men killed and 396 wounded. The day was worse for U.S. troops, who suffered 223 killed, 394 wounded, and 1,623 missing. The losses were a deep blow to the black regiment under Sturgis's command. In the hasty retreat, they stripped off commemorative badges that read "Remember Fort Pillow" to avoid goading the Confederate force pursuing them.

One month later, while serving under General Stephen D. Lee, Forrest experienced tactical defeat at the Battle of Tupelo in 1864. Concerned about U.S. Army supply lines, Maj. Gen. Sherman sent a force under the command of Maj. Gen. Andrew J. Smith to deal with Forrest. U.S. Army forces drove the Confederates from the field, and Forrest was wounded in the foot, but his forces were not wholly destroyed. He continued to oppose U.S. Army efforts in the West for the remainder of the war.

Tennessee Raids

Forrest led other raids that summer and fall, including a famous one into U.S. Army-held downtown Memphis in August 1864 (the Second Battle of Memphis) and another on a major U.S. Army supply depot at Johnsonville, Tennessee. On November 4, 1864, during the Battle of Johnsonville, the Confederates shelled the city, sinking three gunboats and nearly thirty other ships and destroying many tons of supplies. During Hood's Tennessee Campaign, he fought alongside General John Bell Hood, the newest commander of the Confederate Army of Tennessee, in the Second Battle of Franklin on November 30. Facing a disastrous defeat, Forrest argued bitterly with Hood (his superior officer) demanding permission to cross the Harpeth River and cut off the escape route of U.S. Army Maj. Gen. John M. Schofield's army. He eventually attempted, but it was too late.

Murfreesboro, Nashville, and Selma
After his bloody defeat at Franklin, Hood continued to Nashville. Hood ordered Forrest to conduct an independent raid against the Murfreesboro garrison. After success in achieving the objectives specified by Hood, Forrest engaged U.S. forces near Murfreesboro on December 5, 1864. In what would be known as the Third Battle of Murfreesboro, a portion of Forrest's command broke and ran. When Hood's battle-hardened Army of Tennessee, consisting of 40,000 men deployed in three infantry corps plus 10,000 to 15,000 cavalry, was all but destroyed on December 15–16, at the Battle of Nashville, Forrest distinguished himself by commanding the Confederate rear guard in a series of actions that allowed what was left of the army to escape. For this, he would later be promoted to the rank of lieutenant general on March 2, 1865. A portion of his command, now dismounted, was surprised and captured in their camp at Verona, Mississippi on December 25, 1864, during a raid of the Mobile and Ohio Railroad by a brigade of Brig. Gen. Benjamin Grierson's cavalry division.

In the spring of 1865, Forrest led an unsuccessful defense of the state of Alabama against Wilson's Raid. His opponent, U.S. Army Brig. Gen. James H. Wilson, defeated Forrest at the Battle of Selma on April 2, 1865. A week later, General Robert E. Lee surrendered to Grant in Virginia. When he received news of Lee's surrender, Forrest surrendered as well. On May 9, 1865, at Gainesville, Forrest read his farewell address to the men under his command, urging them to "submit to the powers to be, and to aid in restoring peace and establishing law and order throughout the land."

Postwar years and later life

Business ventures
As a former enslaver, Forrest experienced the abolition of slavery at the war's end as a major financial setback. During the war, he became interested in the area around Crowley's Ridge and took up civilian life in 1865 in Memphis, Tennessee. In 1866, Forrest and C.C. McCreanor contracted to finish the Memphis & Little Rock Railroad, including a right-of-way that passed over the ridge. The ridgetop commissary he built as a provisioning store for the 1,000 Irish laborers hired to lay the rails became the nucleus of a town, which most residents called "Forrest's Town" and which was incorporated as Forrest City, Arkansas in 1870.

The historian Court Carney writes that Forrest was not universally popular in the white Memphis community: he alienated many of the city's business people in his commercial dealings and was criticized for questionable business practices that caused him to default on debts.

He later found employment at the Selma-based Marion & Memphis Railroad and eventually became the company president. He was not as successful in railroad promotion as in war, and, under his direction, the company went bankrupt. Nearly ruined as the result of this failure, Forrest spent his final days running an eight-hundred-acre farm on land he leased on President's Island in the Mississippi River, where he and his wife lived in a log cabin. There, with the labor of over a hundred prison convicts, he grew corn, potatoes, vegetables, and cotton profitably, but his health steadily declined.

Offers his services to Sherman
During the Virginius Affair of 1873, some of Forrest's old Confederate friends were filibusters aboard the vessel; consequently, he wrote a letter to the then General-in-Chief of the United States Army William T. Sherman and offered his services in case a war were to break out between the United States and Spain. Sherman, who had recognized how formidable an opponent Forrest was in battle during the Civil War, replied after the crisis settled down. He thanked Forrest for the offer and stated that had war broken out, he would have considered it an honor to have served side by side with him.

Ku Klux Klan membership

Forrest was an early member of the Ku Klux Klan (KKK), which was formed by six veterans of the Confederate Army in Pulaski, Tennessee, during the spring of 1866 and soon expanded throughout the state and beyond. Forrest became involved sometime in late 1866 or early 1867. A common report is that Forrest arrived in Nashville in April 1867 while the Klan was meeting at the Maxwell House Hotel, probably at the encouragement of a state Klan leader, former Confederate general George Gordon. The organization had grown to the point that an experienced commander was needed, and Forrest was well-suited to assume the role. In Room 10 of the Maxwell, Forrest was sworn in as a member by John W. Morton. Brian Steel Wills quotes two KKK members who identified Forrest as a Klan leader. James R. Crowe stated, "After the order grew to large numbers we found it necessary to have someone of large experience to command. We chose General Forrest". Another member wrote, "N. B. Forest of Confederate fame was at our head, and was known as the Grand Wizard. I heard him make a speech in one of our Dens". The title "Grand Wizard" was chosen because General Forrest had been known as "The Wizard of the Saddle" during the war. According to Jack Hurst's 1993 biography, "Two years after Appomattox, Forrest was reincarnated as grand wizard of the Ku Klux Klan. As the Klan's first national leader, he became the Lost Cause's avenging angel, galvanizing a loose collection of boyish secret social clubs into a reactionary instrument of terror still feared today." Forrest was the Klan's first and only Grand Wizard, and he was active in recruitment for the Klan from 1867 to 1868.

Following the war, the United States Congress began passing the Reconstruction Acts to specify conditions for the readmission of former Confederate States to the United States, including ratification of the Fourteenth (1868), and Fifteenth (1870) Amendments to the United States Constitution. The Fourteenth addressed citizenship rights and equal protection of the laws for formerly enslaved people, while the Fifteenth specifically secured the voting rights of black men. According to Wills, in the August 1867 state elections the Klan was relatively restrained in its actions. White Americans who made up the KKK hoped to persuade black voters that returning to their pre-war state of bondage was in their best interest. Forrest assisted in maintaining order. After these efforts failed, Klan violence and intimidation escalated and became widespread. Author Andrew Ward, however, writes, "In the spring of 1867, Forrest and his dragoons launched a campaign of midnight parades; 'ghost' masquerades; and 'whipping' and even 'killing Negro voters and white Republicans, to scare blacks off voting and running for office.

In an 1868 interview by a Cincinnati newspaper, Forrest claimed that the Klan had 40,000 members in Tennessee and 550,000 total members throughout the Southern United States. He said he sympathized with them, but denied any formal connection, although he claimed he could muster thousands of men himself. He described the Klan as "a protective political military organization ... The members are sworn to recognize the government of the United States ... Its objects originally were protection against Loyal Leagues and the Grand Army of the Republic ...". After only a year as Grand Wizard, in January 1869, faced with an ungovernable membership employing methods that seemed increasingly counterproductive, Forrest dissolved the Klan, ordered their costumes destroyed, and withdrew from participation. His declaration had little effect, and few Klansmen destroyed their robes and hoods.

In 1871, the U.S. Congressional Committee Report stated that "The natural tendency of all such organizations is to violence and crime, hence it was that Gen. Forrest and other men of influence by the exercise of their moral power, induced them to disband".

Democratic convention 1868

The Klan's activity infiltrated the Democratic Party's campaign for the presidential election of 1868. Prominent ex-Confederates, including Forrest, the Grand Wizard of the Klan, and South Carolina's Wade Hampton, attended as delegates at the 1868 Democratic Convention, held at Tammany Hall headquarters at 141 East 14th Street in New York City. Forrest rode to the convention on a train that was stopped just outside of a small town along the way, when he was confronted by a well-known fighter shouting "d[amne]d butcher" and wanting to "thrash" him. When Forrest rose and approached the bully his larger challenger's "purpose evaporated." Former Governor of New York Horatio Seymour was nominated as the Democratic presidential candidate, while Forrest's friend, Francis Preston Blair Jr., was nominated as the Democratic vice presidential candidate, Seymour's running mate. The Seymour–Blair Democratic ticket's campaign slogan was: "Our Ticket, Our Motto, This Is a White Man's Country; Let White Men Rule". The Democratic Party platform denounced the Reconstruction Acts as unconstitutional, void, and revolutionary. The party advocated the termination of the Freedman's Bureau and any government policy designed to aid blacks in the Southern United States. These developments worked to the advantage of the Republicans, who focused on the Democratic Party's alleged disloyalty during and after the Civil War.

Election of 1868 and Grant

During the presidential election of 1868, the Ku Klux Klan, under the leadership of Forrest, and other terrorist groups, used brutal violence and intimidation against blacks and Republican voters. Forrest played a prominent role in the spread of the Klan in the Southern United States, meeting with racist whites in Atlanta several times between February and March 1868. Forrest probably organized a statewide Klan network in Georgia during these visits. On March 31, the Klan struck, killing prominent Republican organizer George Ashburn in Columbus.

The Republicans had nominated one of Forrest's battle adversaries, U.S. war hero Ulysses S. Grant, for the Presidency at their convention held in October. Klansmen took their orders from their former Confederate officers. In Louisiana, 1,000 blacks were killed to suppress Republican voting. In Georgia, blacks and Republicans also faced a lot of violence. The Klan's violence was primarily designed to intimidate voters, targeting black and white supporters of the Republican Party. The Klan's violent tactics backfired, as Grant, whose slogan was "Let us have peace", won the election and Republicans gained a majority in Congress. Grant defeated Horatio Seymour, the Democratic presidential candidate, by a comfortable electoral margin, 214 to 80. The popular vote was much closer: Grant received 3,013,365 (52.7%) votes, while Seymour received 2,708,744 (47.3%) votes. Grant lost Georgia and Louisiana, where the violence and intimidation against blacks were most prominent.

Klan prosecution and Congressional testimony (1871)
Many in the United States, including President Grant, backed the passage of the Fifteenth Amendment, which gave voting rights to Americans regardless of "race, color, or previous condition of servitude". Congress and Grant passed the Enforcement Acts from 1870 to 1871 to protect the "registration, voting, officeholding, or jury service" of African Americans. Under these laws enforced by Grant and the newly formed Department of Justice, there were over 5,000 indictments and 1,000 convictions of Klan members across the Southern United States.

Forrest testified before the Congressional investigation of Klan activities on June 27, 1871. He denied membership, but his role in the KKK was beyond the scope of the investigating committee, which wrote: "Our design is not to connect General Forrest with this order (the reader may form his own conclusion upon this question)". The committee also noted, "The natural tendency of all such organizations is to violence and crime; hence it was that General Forrest and other men of influence in the state, by the exercise of their moral power, induced them to disband". George Cantor, a biographer of Confederate generals, wrote, "Forrest ducked and weaved, denying all knowledge, but admitted he knew some of the people involved. He sidestepped some questions and pleaded failure of memory on others. Afterwards, he admitted to 'gentlemanly lies'. He wanted nothing more to do with the Klan, but felt honor bound to protect former associates."

Racial Reconciliation (1870s)
After the lynch mob murder of four black people who had been arrested for defending themselves in a brawl at a barbecue, Forrest wrote to Tennessee Governor John C. Brown in August 1874 and "volunteered to help 'exterminate' those men responsible for the continued violence against the blacks", offering "to exterminate the white marauders who disgrace their race by this cowardly murder of Negroes".

On July 5, 1875, Forrest gave a speech before the Independent Order of Pole-Bearers Association, a post-war organization of black Southerners advocating to improve black people's economic condition and gain equal rights for all citizens. At this, his last public appearance, he made what The New York Times described as a "friendly speech" during which, when offered a bouquet by a young black woman, he accepted them, thanked her and kissed her on the cheek. Forrest spoke in the encouragement of black advancement and endeavored to be a proponent for espousing peace and harmony between black and white Americans.

In response to the Pole-Bearers speech, the Cavalry Survivors Association of Augusta, the first Confederate organization formed after the war, called a meeting in which Captain F. Edgeworth Eve gave a speech expressing strong disapproval of Forrest's remarks promoting inter-ethnic harmony, ridiculing his faculties and judgment and berating the woman who gave Forrest flowers as "a mulatto wench". The association voted unanimously to amend its constitution to expressly forbid publicly advocating for or hinting at any association of white women and girls as being in the same classes as "females of the negro race". The Macon Weekly Telegraph newspaper also condemned Forrest for his speech, describing the event as "the recent disgusting exhibition of himself at the negro jamboree" and quoting part of a Charlotte Observer article, which read "We have infinitely more respect for Longstreet, who fraternizes with negro men on public occasions, with the pay for the treason to his race in his pocket, than with Forrest and [General] Pillow, who equalize with the negro women, with only 'futures' in payment".

Just a few months before his death, Forrest attended an African-American barbecue in Memphis. Aiming to right his past wrongs, Forrest encouraged African-Americans to "work, be industrious, live honestly and act truly", as well as declaring that "when you are oppressed, I'll come to your relief".

Death
Forrest reportedly died from acute complications of diabetes at the Memphis home of his brother Jesse on October 29, 1877. His eulogy was delivered by his recent spiritual mentor, former Confederate chaplain George Tucker Stainback, who declared in his eulogy: "Lieutenant-General Nathan Bedford Forrest, though dead, yet speaketh. His acts have photographed themselves upon the hearts of thousands, and will speak there forever."

Forrest's funeral procession was over two miles long. The crowd of mourners was estimated to include 20,000 people. According to Forrest biographer Jack Hurst, writers present at the public viewing of Forrest's body and the funeral procession noted many black citizens among them.

Forrest was buried at Elmwood Cemetery in Memphis. In 1904, the remains of Forrest and his wife Mary were disinterred from Elmwood and moved to a Memphis city park that was originally named Forrest Park in his honor but has since been renamed Health Sciences Park.

On July 7, 2015, the Memphis City Council unanimously voted to remove the statue of Forrest from Health Sciences Park, and to return the remains of Forrest and his wife to Elmwood Cemetery. However, on October 13, 2017, the Tennessee Historical Commission invoked the Tennessee Heritage Protection Act of 2013 and U.S. Public Law 85-425: Sec. 410 to overrule the city. Consequently, Memphis sold the park land to Memphis Greenspace, a non-profit entity not subject to the Tennessee Heritage Protection Act, which immediately removed the monument as explained below.

Historical reputation and legacy

Many memorials have been erected to Forrest, especially in Tennessee and adjacent southern states. Forrest County, Mississippi is named after him, as is Forrest City, Arkansas. Obelisks in his memory were placed at his birthplace in Chapel Hill, Tennessee and at Nathan Bedford Forrest State Park near Camden.

Forrest was elevated in Memphis—where he lived and died—to the status of folk hero. Historian Court Carney suggested that "embarrassed by their city's early capitulation during the Civil War, white Memphians desperately needed a hero and therefore crafted a distorted depiction of Forrest's role in the war." A memorial to him, the first Civil War memorial in Memphis, was erected in 1905 in a new Nathan Bedford Forrest Park. A bust sculpted by Jane Baxendale is on display at the Tennessee State Capitol building in Nashville. The World War II Army base Camp Forrest in Tullahoma, Tennessee was named after him. It is now the site of the Arnold Engineering Development Center. The Nathan Bedford Forrest Statue in Nashville was particularly notable for its idiosyncratic depiction of Forrest on horseback.

, Tennessee had 32 dedicated historical markers linked to Nathan Bedford Forrest, more than are dedicated to all three former Presidents associated with the state combined: Andrew Jackson, James K. Polk, and Andrew Johnson. The Tennessee legislature established July 13 as "Nathan Bedford Forrest Day". A Tennessee-based organization, the Sons of Confederate Veterans, posthumously awarded Forrest their Confederate Medal of Honor, created in 1977.

A monument to Forrest in the Confederate Circle section of Old Live Oak Cemetery in Selma, Alabama reads "Defender of Selma, Wizard of the Saddle, Untutored Genius, The first with the most. This monument stands as testament of our perpetual devotion and respect for Lieutenant General Nathan Bedford Forrest. CSA 1821–1877, one of the South's finest heroes. In honor of Gen. Forrest's unwavering defense of Selma, the great state of Alabama, and the Confederacy, this memorial is dedicated. DEO VINDICE". As an armory for the Confederacy, Selma provided a substantial part of the Confederacy's ammunition during the American Civil War. The bust of Forrest was stolen from the cemetery monument in March 2012 and replaced in May 2015. A monument to Forrest at a corner of Veterans Plaza in Rome, Georgia was erected by the United Daughters of the Confederacy in 1909 to honor his bravery for defending Rome from U.S. Army Colonel Abel Streight and his cavalry.

High schools named for Forrest were built in Chapel Hill, Tennessee and Jacksonville, Florida. The school in Jacksonville was named for Forrest in 1959 at the urging of the Daughters of the Confederacy because they were upset about the 1954 Brown v. Board of Education decision. In 2008, the Duval County School Board voted 5–2 against a push to change the name of Nathan Bedford Forrest High School in Jacksonville. In 2013, the board voted 7–0 to begin the process to rename the school. At the time the school was all white, but now more than half the student body is black. After several public forums and discussions, Westside High School was unanimously approved in January 2014 as the school's new name.

In August 2000, a road on Fort Bliss named for Forrest decades earlier was renamed for former post commander Richard T. Cassidy. In 2005, Shelby County Commissioner Walter Bailey started an effort to move the statue over Forrest's grave and rename Forrest Park. Former Memphis Mayor Willie Herenton, who is black, blocked the move. Others have tried to remove Forrest's bust from the Tennessee House of Representatives chamber. Leaders in other localities have also tried to remove or eliminate Forrest monuments, with mixed success.

In 1978, Middle Tennessee State University abandoned imagery it had formerly used (in 1951, the school's yearbook, The Midlander, featured the first appearance of Forrest's likeness as MTSU's official mascot) and MTSU president M. G. Scarlett removed the General's image from the university's official seal. The Blue Raiders' athletic mascot was changed to an ambiguous swash-buckler character called the "Blue Raider" to avoid association with Forrest or the Confederacy. The school unveiled its latest mascot, a winged horse named "Lightning" inspired by the mythological Pegasus, during halftime of a basketball game against rival Tennessee State University on January 17, 1998. The ROTC building at MTSU had been named Forrest Hall to honor him in 1958, but the frieze depicting General Forrest on horseback that had adorned the side of the building was removed amid protests in 2006. A significant push to change its name failed on February 16, 2018, when the governor-controlled Tennessee Historical Commission denied Middle Tennessee State University's petition to rename Forrest Hall.

The Forrest Hill Academy high school in Atlanta, Georgia, which had been named for Forrest, was renamed the Hank Aaron New Beginnings Academy in April 2021 after the Atlanta Braves baseball star who had died less than three months prior.

Military doctrines
Forrest is considered one of the Civil War's most brilliant tacticians by the historian Spencer C. Tucker. Forrest fought by simple rules; he maintained that "war means fighting and fighting means killing" and the way to win was "to get there first with the most men". U.S. Army General William Tecumseh Sherman called him "that devil Forrest" in wartime communications with Ulysses S. Grant and considered him "the most remarkable man our civil war produced on either side".

Forrest became well known for his early use of maneuver tactics as applied to a mobile horse cavalry deployment. He grasped the doctrines of mobile warfare that would eventually become prevalent in the 20th century. Paramount in his strategy was fast movement, even if it meant pushing his horses at a killing pace, to constantly harass the enemy during raids by disrupting their supply trains and communications with the destruction of railroad tracks and the cutting of telegraph lines, as he wheeled around his opponent's flank. The Civil War scholar Bruce Catton writes:

Forrest is often erroneously quoted as saying his strategy was to "git thar fustest with the mostest". Now often recast as "Getting there firstest with the mostest", this misquote first appeared in a New York Tribune article written to provide colorful comments in reaction to European interest in Civil War generals. The aphorism was addressed and corrected as "Ma'am, I got there first with the most men" by a New York Times story in 1918. Though it was a novel and succinct condensation of the military principles of mass and maneuver, Bruce Catton writes of the spurious quote:

War record and promotions
 Enlisted as private July 1861. (White's Company "E", Tennessee Mounted Rifles)
 Commissioned as lieutenant colonel, October 1861 (3rd Tennessee Cavalry)
 Promoted to colonel, February 1862
 Battle of Fort Donelson, February 12–16, 1862
 Wounded at Battle of Shiloh, April 6–8, 1862
 Promoted to brigadier general, July 21, 1862
 First Battle of Murfreesboro, July 1862
 Raids in Tennessee, Kentucky, and Mississippi, early December 1862 – early January 1863
 Battle of Day's Gap, April 30 – May 2, 1863
 Assigned to command Forrest's Cavalry Corps, May 1863
 Battle of Chickamauga, September 18–20, 1863
 Promoted to major general, December 4, 1863
 Battle of Paducah, March 25, 1864
 Battle of Fort Pillow, April 12, 1864
 Battle of Brices Crossroads, June 10, 1864
 Battle of Tupelo, July 14–15, 1864
 Raids in Tennessee, August–October 1864
 Battle of Spring Hill, November 29, 1864
 Battle of Franklin, November 30, 1864
 Third Battle of Murfreesboro, December 5–7, 1864
 Battle of Nashville, December 15–16, 1864
 Promoted to lieutenant general, February 28, 1865
 Battle of Selma, April 2, 1865
 Farewell address to his troops, May 9, 1865

Fort Pillow
Modern historians generally believe that Forrest's attack on Fort Pillow was a massacre, noting high casualty rates and the rebels targeting black soldiers. Forrest's claim that the Fort Pillow massacre was an invention of U.S. reporters is contradicted by letters written by Confederate soldiers to their own families, which described extreme brutality on the part of Confederate troops. It was the Confederacy's publicly stated position that formerly enslaved people firing on whites would be killed on the spot, along with Southern whites that fought for the Union, whom the Confederacy considered traitors. According to this analysis, Forrest's troops were carrying out Confederate policy. The historical record does not support his repeated denials that he knew a massacre was taking place or that he even knew a massacre had occurred at all. Consequently, his role at Fort Pillow was a stigmatizing one for him the rest of his life, both professionally and personally, and contributed to his business problems after the war.

Historians have differed in their interpretations of the events at Fort Pillow. Richard L. Fuchs, author of An Unerring Fire, concluded:

Andrew Ward downplays the controversy:

John Cimprich states:

The site is now a Tennessee State Historic Park.

Grant himself described Forrest as "a brave and intrepid cavalry general" while noting that Forrest sent a dispatch on the Fort Pillow Massacre "in which he left out the part which shocks humanity to read".

In popular culture
In the 1990 PBS documentary The Civil War by Ken Burns, historian Shelby Foote states in Episode 7 that the Civil War produced two "authentic geniuses": Abraham Lincoln and Nathan Bedford Forrest. When he expressed his opinion to one of General Forrest's granddaughters, she replied after a pause, "You know, we never thought much of Mr. Lincoln in my family". Foote also made Forrest a major character in his novel Shiloh, which used numerous first-person stories to illustrate a detailed timeline and account of the battle.

Tom Hanks' title character in the film Forrest Gump remarks in one scene that his mother named him after Nathan Bedford Forrest and "we was related to him in some way". The following scene satirically depicts Hanks as Forrest in a Ku Klux Klan outfit, donning a hood and being superimposed into Klan footage from The Birth of a Nation.

Continuing controversies

Forrest's legacy as "one of the most controversial—and popular—icons of the war" still draws heated public debate.

A 2011 Mississippi license plate proposal to honor him by the Sons of Confederate Veterans revived tensions and raised objections from Mississippi NAACP chapter president Derrick Johnson, who compared Forrest to Osama bin Laden and Saddam Hussein. The Mississippi NAACP petitioned Governor Haley Barbour to denounce the plates and prevent their distribution. Barbour refused to denounce the honor. Instead, he noted that the state legislature would not likely approve the plate anyway.

In 2000, a monument to Forrest was unveiled in Selma, Alabama. On March 10, 2012, it was vandalized, and the bronze bust of the general disappeared. In August, a historical society called Friends of Forrest moved forward with plans for a new, larger monument to be 12 feet high, illuminated by LED lights, surrounded by a wrought-iron fence, and protected by 24-hour security cameras. The plans triggered outrage, and around 20 protesters attempted to block the construction of the new monument by lying in the path of a concrete truck. Local lawyer and radio host Rose Sanders said, "Glorifying Nathan B. Forrest here is like glorifying a Nazi in Germany. For Selma, of all places, to have a big monument to a Klansman is totally unacceptable". An online petition at Change.org asking the City Council to ban the monument collected 313,617 signatures by mid-September of the same year.

In 2013, Forrest Park in Memphis was renamed the Health Sciences Park amid substantial controversy. In light of the 2015 church shooting in Charleston, South Carolina, some Tennessee lawmakers advocated removing a bust of Forrest located in the state's Capitol building. Subsequently, then-Mayor A C Wharton urged that the statue of Forrest be removed from the Health Sciences Park and suggested that the remains of Forrest and his wife be relocated to their original burial site in nearby Elmwood Cemetery. In a nearly unanimous vote on July 7, the Memphis City Council passed a resolution in favor of removing the statue and securing the couple's remains for transfer. The Tennessee Historical Commission denied removal on October 21, 2016, under the authority granted it by the Tennessee Heritage Protection Act of 2013, which prevents cities and counties from relocating, removing, renaming, or otherwise disturbing without permission war memorials on public property. The City Council then voted on December 20, 2017, to sell Health Sciences Park to Memphis Greenspace, a new non-profit corporation not subject to the Heritage Protection Act, which removed the statue and another of Jefferson Davis that same evening. The Sons of Confederate Veterans threatened a lawsuit against the city.

On April 18, 2018, the Tennessee House of Representatives punished Memphis by cutting $250,000 in appropriations for the city's bicentennial celebration. Brett Joseph Forrest, a direct descendant of Nathan, spoke in support of the bust's removal.

As of 2019, Nathan Bedford Forrest Day was still observed in Tennessee, though some Democrats in the state had attempted to change the law, which required Tennessee's governor to sign a proclamation honoring the holiday. However, since that time, Governor Bill Lee's administration introduced a bill – passed by the Tennessee legislature on June 10, 2020 – which released the governor from the former requirement that he proclaim that observance each year and a spokesperson for Governor Lee confirmed that he would not be signing a Forrest Day proclamation in July 2020.

In June 2020, after Black members of the Tennessee House of Representatives unsuccessfully asked it to eliminate a state celebration of Forrest, Representative Cameron Sexton opined: "I don’t think anybody here is truly racist. I think people may make insensitive comments." In 2021 Sexton voted against the removal of the bust of Forrest from the Tennessee State Capitol and into the Tennessee State Museum, but only one other legislator agreed with him, and the bust was removed. Sexton said that he believed the removal of the bust "aligns ... with the teaching of communism."

On June 3, 2021, the remains of Forrest and his wife were exhumed from their burial place in the park, where they had been for over a century, to be reburied in Columbia, Tennessee. The exhumation and reburial were the results of a campaign that began after the Unite the Right Rally in Charlottesville, Virginia, in 2017. The effort was spearheaded by Take 'Em Down 901, an organization dedicated to removing Confederate iconography founded by activist Tami Sawyer. After the Forrests' remains were removed from Memphis, they were reportedly buried in Munford, Tennessee until their reburial in Columbia in September 2021 by the Sons of Confederate Veterans.

See also

 Cavalry in the American Civil War
 Leaders of the Ku Klux Klan
 List of American Civil War generals (Confederate)
 Nathan Bedford Forrest bust in the Tennessee General Assembly building
 Emma Sansom
 Removal of Confederate monuments and memorials

Notes

References

Author
 
 
 
 
 
 . 
 
 
 
 
 .
 
 
 
 
 
 Silkenat, David. Raising the White Flag: How Surrender Defined the American Civil War. Chapel Hill: University of North Carolina Press, 2019. .

Internet

Further reading
 
 
 
 
 
 
 
 
 
 
 
 Scales, John R. (2017). The Battles and Campaigns of Confederate General Nathan Bedford Forrest, 1861–1865. El Dorado Hills, CA: Savas Beatie. .
 Silkenat, David. Raising the White Flag: How Surrender Defined the American Civil War. Chapel Hill: University of North Carolina Press, 2019. .
  – on Ft Pillow.
 
 
 Wills, Brian Steel (1992). The Confederacy's Greatest Cavalryman: Nathan Bedford Forrest. Lawrence: University Press of Kansas. .

External links

 Animated History of The Campaigns of Nathan Bedford Forrest  at civilwaranimated.com
 General Nathan Bedford Forrest Historical Society

 
1821 births
1877 deaths
American duellists
American Freemasons
American planters
American people of English descent
American people of Scotch-Irish descent
American slave owners
American slave traders
Burials in Tennessee
Cavalry commanders
Confederate States Army lieutenant generals
Deaths from diabetes
Forrest family
Leaders of the Ku Klux Klan
People from Chapel Hill, Tennessee
People of Tennessee in the American Civil War
Tennessee Democrats
Ku Klux Klan in Tennessee
American Ku Klux Klan members